There are several possible meanings for Guttenberg, Guttenburg or Gutenburg:

People
 David Guttenberg (born 1951), U.S. state politician (Alaska)
 Enoch zu Guttenberg (1946–2018), German conductor, father of Karl-Theodor
 Fred Guttenberg, American activist against gun violence
 The House of Guttenberg, a Franconian noble family
 Johannes Gutenberg (1400–1468), introduced moveable type printing to Europe
 Johann Lorenz Trunck von Guttenberg (1661–1742), Mayor of Vienna 1713–1716
 Karl-Theodor zu Guttenberg, (born 1971), former Minister of Defence (Germany), son of Enoch zu Guttenberg
 Steve Guttenberg (born 1958), American actor

Places
 Guttenberg, Bavaria, Germany
 Guttenberg, Iowa, United States
 Guttenberg, New Jersey, United States

Guttenburg
 Guttenburg, a German brig that wrecked on the Goodwin Sands on 1 January 1860

See also 
 Gutenberg (disambiguation)
 Gutenburg (disambiguation)

German-language surnames

th:กูเทนเบิร์ก